In the Palace of the King is a 1923 American silent historical romantic drama film based on the novel of the same name by F. Marion Crawford. Directed by Emmett J. Flynn, the film stars Blanche Sweet, Pauline Starke, and Edmund Lowe.

A previous silent version had been made and released in 1915 by the Essanay company and starred Richard Travers and Nell Craig.  Prior to the films, the novel was adapted into a Broadway play in 1900 starring Viola Allen and her father C. Leslie Allen.

Plot
As described in a film magazine review, Don John, brother of Philip II of Spain, is sent to war with the Moors, the king wishing to be rid of him. Don John loves Dolores, daughter of General Mendoza, but her father does not trust him. Returning in triumph, Don John quarrels with Philip, who stabs him with apparent fatal effect. To save the King, Mendoza assumes the guilt of murder. Dolores threatens Philip with exposure and he signs a pardon for Mendoza. Don John reappears and receives Philip's royal consent for his marriage to Dolores.

Cast

Preservation

With no copies of In the Palace of the King located in any film archives, it is a lost film.

See also
Blanche Sweet filmography

References

External links

Stills at silenthollywood.com

1923 films
1920s historical romance films
1923 romantic drama films
Remakes of American films
American romantic drama films
American silent feature films
American black-and-white films
Films based on American novels
Films based on works by Francis Marion Crawford
Films directed by Emmett J. Flynn
Films set in the 16th century
Films set in Madrid
Goldwyn Pictures films
American historical romance films
1920s American films
Silent romantic drama films
Silent American drama films
1920s English-language films
Silent historical romance films